Bursera lunanii is a species of plant in the Burseraceae family. It is endemic to Jamaica and listed as "near threatened."

References

Plants described in 1825
lunanii
Near threatened plants
Endemic flora of Jamaica
Taxonomy articles created by Polbot